Park Ji-min (born July 5, 1997), professionally known as Jamie or Jamie Park, and formerly Jimin Park, is a South Korean singer, songwriter, and television host. She is best known as the winner of the first season of K-pop Star and as a former member of the vocal duo 15& and the project group M.O.L.A. She was formerly a co-host of the variety show After School Club from 2014 to 2022.

Early life and education
Park Ji-min was born on July 5, 1997 in Daejeon. She lived in Thailand for eight years and went to Garden International School Bangkok where she was given the English name Jamie. Her family currently lives in Seoul. Park speaks Korean (her native language), fluent English, and basic Thai. She has graduated at the Hanlim School of Performing Arts alongside group member Baek Yerin, as well as label mate Yugyeom of Got7 in 2016.

Career

K-pop Star and 15&
In 2011, Park participated in the first season of competition television show K-pop Star. Park later finished in first place in the competition and had the opportunity to sign with YG, SM or JYPE. On May 21, 2012, Park officially chose to sign with JYP Entertainment. Park also received a brand new Hyundai i40 and 300 million won (~$257,400 USD), was cast in a drama, and was also given an opportunity to sign a contract as a CF model.

On September 19, 2012, it was announced that Park would debuting with a duo along with Baek Yerin. Park officially debuted with duo 15& with released digital single "I Dream" on October 5, 2012 and making official debut stage on the music program Inkigayo on October 7. 15& eventually went on hiatus after February 2015 and de facto disbanded following Park's departure from JYP Entertainment.

Solo career
In July 2014, Park became a co-host for Arirang TV's After School Club and has been the longest-serving host on the show and has hosted with many co-hosts including Eric Nam and eaJ.

On March 31, 2015 Park Jin-young revealed that Park would make her solo debut. She released her debut single "Hopeless Love" on April 5 with the name Jimin Park and made her debut stage before the finals of K-pop Star 4 on the same day.

On May 19, 2015 producer group Sweetune revealed that Park and Eric Nam would release a duet called "Dream" for Charity Project. The song was released on May 28, 2015.

On August 14, 2015, Park announced a project group she had formed with Seung-youn of UNIQ and rapper Nathan. Their group name was later revealed to be M.O.L.A (Make Our Life Awesome), and they released their first track "My Way" on August 20. Their second song "Trick or Treat" was released on October 31, where Jimin made her second recorded comeback as a rapper.

On August 23, 2016, Park released her first EP 19 to 20 with the lead single 'Try'. Due to Naver's V-LIVE, Park stated that 19 to 20 is about "her story" and hoped that her fans would be able to connect to her better and build a stronger relationship with her first self-composed album.

On September 4, 2018, Park released her second EP Jiminxjamie, where she participated in the composition for majority of the tracks.

Following the expiration of her seven-year contract with JYP Entertainment, Park left the company on August 6, 2019.

On April 21, 2020, it was announced that Park has signed an exclusive contract with Warner Music Korea, and will continue to promote as Jamie.

On September 3, 2020, Park made her first comeback under her new agency Warner Music Korea with single "Numbers" feat Changmo  Her second song "Apollo 11", featuring Jay Park released on November 11, 2020.

On December 8, 2020, Park released holiday song "5 Christmas Languages" 

On September 15, 2021, Park released the digital single "No Numbers", featuring Jmin.

2022–present
On February 3, 2022, Park released the English digital single "Pity Party".

After hosting for over seven years, on August 12, 2022, it was confirmed that Jamie was preparing to leave After School Club in order to focus on her music career and to work on her upcoming album. Her last appearance on After School Club was on August 16, 2022.

On August 17, Jamie confirmed that she was preparing for a comeback in October, and is currently preparing for the release of a new EP album.

On August 29, 2022, the label released Jamie's new EP album "One Bad Night" through their official SNS, which will be released on October 5.

On August 30, 2022, Jamie released a poster for her North American 2022 tour through her official SNS channel. It will host concerts in seven cities: Los Angeles (LA), Vancouver, Toronto, Brooklyn (New York), Dallas, Seattle and San Francisco From 10 to 23 October.

On January 5, 2023, Warner Music Korea tweeted that they and Jamie agreed to terminate her exclusive contract upon expiration, and thanked her for her hard work and dedication.

Charity work
In October 2012, Park donated 50 million won (~$45,000 USD) to Hanbit Performing Arts Company for blind musicians. She became interested in the program after meeting with fellow K-pop Star contestant Kim Soo-hwan, who currently attends the Hanbit Performing Arts Company. Park shared, “The Hanbit Performing Arts Company hosts young, elementary school students as well as professional performers. Although they are blind, they are musicians who are performing with amazing talent. I want to be at least a small help to those who have the same love for music that I have.” She also donated 50 million won (~$45,000 USD) to World Vision.

On May 28, 2015, Park collaborated with singer Eric Nam for their song, "Dream", produced by Sweetune. They revealed all profit made from the song would be donated to charity.

Discography

Extended plays

Singles

Other charted songs

Soundtrack appearances

K-pop Star 1 songs

Unofficial original releases

Filmography

Drama

Television shows

Music videos

Awards and nominations

References

External links
 
 

1997 births
Living people
21st-century South Korean singers
Hanlim Multi Art School alumni
JYP Entertainment artists
K-pop Star winners
People from Daejeon
South Korean female idols
South Korean women pop singers
South Korean Protestants
South Korean rhythm and blues singers
South Korean singer-songwriters
21st-century South Korean women singers
South Korean women singer-songwriters